Tristan Cheung (born 10 March 2000) is a Hong Kong professional footballer who is currently a free agent.

References

Living people
2000 births
Hong Kong footballers
Association football forwards
Hong Kong First Division League players
Hong Kong Premier League players
Metro Gallery FC players
Hong Kong FC players